is  the Head coach of the Osaka Evessa in the Japanese B.League.

Head coaching record

|- 
| style="text-align:left;"|Matsushita Kangaroos
| style="text-align:left;"|2003
| 28||14||14||||4th |||2||0||2||
|4th in JBL 
|- 
| style="text-align:left;"|Matsushita Kangaroos
| style="text-align:left;"|2004
| 28||14||14||||5th |||-||-||-||
|5th in JBL 
|- 
|- style="background:#FDE910;"
| style="text-align:left;"|Osaka Evessa
| style="text-align:left;"|2005-06
| 40||31||9||||1st |||2||2||0||
|Bj Champions 
|-
|- style="background:#FDE910;" 
| style="text-align:left;"|Osaka Evessa
| style="text-align:left;"|2006-07
| 40||29||11||||1st |||2||2||0||
|Bj Champions 
|-
|- style="background:#FDE910;"
 | style="text-align:left;"|Osaka Evessa
| style="text-align:left;"|2007-08
| 44||31||13||||1st in Western |||2||2||0||
|Bj Champions 
|- 
| style="text-align:left;"|Osaka Evessa
| style="text-align:left;"|2008-09
| 52||35||17||||2nd in Western |||5||2||3||
|4th place 
|- 
| style="text-align:left;"|Osaka Evessa
| style="text-align:left;"|2009-10
| 52||34||18||||1st |||4||3||1||
|Western Champions 
|- 
|- style="background:#FDE910;"
| style="text-align:left;"|Nishinomiya Storks
| style="text-align:left;"|2016-17
| 60||43||17||||1st in B2 Central|||3||3||0||
|B2 Champions 
|- 
| style="text-align:left;"|Nishinomiya Storks
| style="background-color:#FFCCCC" "text-align:left;"|2017-18
| 60||12||48||||5th in Western |||-||-||-||
|
|- 
| style="text-align:left;"|Osaka Evessa
| style= "text-align:left;"|2019-20
| 41||26||15||||2nd in Western |||-||-||-||
|
|- 
|- 
|-

References

1966 births
Living people
Aisin AW Areions Anjo coaches
Japanese basketball coaches
Nishinomiya Storks coaches
Osaka Evessa coaches
Panasonic Trians players
Sportspeople from Sydney